Robert Cummings (June 16, 1833 – January 16, 1910) was a Canadian manufacturer and community leader.

He was born in Gloucester Township, Ontario to a family of Irish immigrants in 1833. He learned the trade of carriage making and became a leading Canadian manufacturer. He opened a general store and operated a flour mill on Cummings Island in the Rideau River which became the nucleus of a new community, Janeville, which eventually became part of Vanier. He served ten years as reeve in the township, was also a Justice of the Peace and was elected warden for Carleton County in 1876. Cummings was also a captain in the local militia. He married Agnes Borthwick (1840–1921).

The Cummings Bridge across the Rideau River was named after him.

References 

 Carleton Saga, Harry & Olive Walker (1968)
 Historical Sketch of the County of Carleton (1971) - originally published in 1879, reprinted by Mika Press, Belleville, Ontario

1833 births
1910 deaths
Mayors and reeves of Gloucester Township, Ontario
Canadian people of Irish descent